Whartons Branch is a  long 2nd order tributary to Indian River, in Sussex County, Delaware.

Variant names
According to the Geographic Names Information System, it has also been known historically as:  
Whartin's Branch

Course
Whartons Branch rises on the Unity Branch divide about 0.1 miles south of Mission in Sussex County, Delaware.  Whartons Branch then flows in a semi-circular route before turning north to meet Indian River at Old Landing, Delaware.

Watershed
Whartons Branch drains  of area, receives about 45.0 in/year of precipitation, has a topographic wetness index of 827.12 and is about 5.4% forested.

See also
List of rivers of Delaware

References 

Rivers of Delaware